1st Constitution Bancorp was a bank holding company based in Cranbury, New Jersey that operated 1st Constitution Bank until its acquisition by Lakeland Bancorp, Inc.

History
1st Constitution Bank was founded in 1989.

In 1999, 1st Constitution Bancorp was established as a bank holding company.

In October 2010, the company repaid the $12 million that it received from the Troubled Asset Relief Program.

In 2013, the company acquired Rumson-Fair Haven Bank and Trust for $24.3 million.

In June 2016, the company expanded the size of its board of directors from 5 to 8 members.

In 2017, the company acquired New Jersey Community Bank for $7.6 million.

In June 2019, the company announced its intent to acquire Shore Community Bank in a deal valued at $53.1 million. The deal was approved and closed in November 2019.

In January 2022, Lakeland Bancorp acquired 1st Constitution Bancorp in an all-stock deal.

References

External links

Banks based in New Jersey
Banks established in 1989
Companies formerly listed on the Nasdaq
Cranbury, New Jersey
2022 mergers and acquisitions